Slickdeals is an American online coupon and deal-sharing website based in Las Vegas, Nevada.

History
Slickdeals was founded in 1999.

In 2012, Warburg Pincus made an investment in Slickdeals. 

In 2018, Hearst Corp and Goldman Sachs's private equity subsidiary, West Street Capital, acquired Slickdeals. At the time of the acquisition, Slickdeals had more than 10 million active users.

Platform
Slickdeals' platform allows users to share, review, and give feedback on deals and coupons in the U.S. It also provides deal listings provided by the community and special saving coupons. USA Today called it one of the largest online deal-sharing communities.

It is also available as a browser extension.

References

Online retailers of the United States
Reward websites
Internet properties established in 1999
Companies based in Las Vegas
1999 establishments in Nevada